Miguel Alfredo Portillo (born September 26, 1982 in Gobernador Virasoro), nicknamed Pipo, is a football defender from Argentina who currently plays for the Swiss regional side FC Köniz.

Career 
Portillo started his career at Argentine giants Boca Juniors in 2001, he never played a league game for the club but took part in 2 Copa Mercosur games in 2001. He has had spells at several Swiss clubs and the French team Angers SCO, on 5 September 2009 AC Lugano have signed Young Boys' Argentinian defender on loan until the end of the season. After the season ended, Portillo joined FC Chornomorets Odesa in July 2010.

External links
 Profile & Statistics at Guardian's Stats Centre
BSC Young Boys profile 
football.ch profile

References

1982 births
Argentine footballers
Argentine people of Spanish descent
Sportspeople from Corrientes Province
Angers SCO players
FC Chornomorets Odesa players
Neuchâtel Xamax FCS players
Servette FC players
BSC Young Boys players
Living people
Beitar Jerusalem F.C. players
Israeli Premier League players
Argentine expatriate footballers
Expatriate footballers in Switzerland
Expatriate footballers in France
Expatriate footballers in Ukraine
Argentine expatriate sportspeople in Switzerland
Argentine expatriate sportspeople in France
Argentine expatriate sportspeople in Ukraine
Association football defenders